The Ruby Braff Octet with Pee Wee Russell & Bobby Henderson at Newport is a live album by Ruby Braff's Octet with Pee Wee Russell and solo pianist Bobby Henderson recorded at the Newport Jazz Festival in 1957 and released on the Verve label.

Reception

The Allmusic site awarded the album 4½ stars.

Track listing
 "It Don't Mean a Thing (If It Ain't Got That Swing)" (Duke Ellington, Irving Mills) - 7:52
 "These Foolish Things (Remind Me of You)" (Jack Strachey, Eric Maschwitz) - 4:53
 "Oh, Lady Be Good!" (George Gershwin, Ira Gershwin) - 7:14
 "Jitterbug Waltz" (Fats Waller) - 3:33
 "Keepin' Out of Mischief Now" (Waller, Andy Razaf) - 2:26
 "Blues for Louis" (Bobby Henderson) - 5:00
 "Honeysuckle Rose" (Waller, Razaf) - 3:08

Personnel

Tracks 1-3
Ruby Braff - trumpet
Pee Wee Russell - clarinet
Jimmy Welch - valve trombone
Sam Margolis - tenor saxophone 
Nat Pierce - piano
Steve Jordan - guitar
Walter Page - bass
Buzzy Drootin - drums

Tracks 4-7
Bobby Henderson - piano

References

Verve Records live albums
Albums recorded at the Newport Jazz Festival
1957 live albums
Albums produced by Norman Granz